Georgi Ivanov may refer to:

Georgi Ivanov (cosmonaut) (born 1940), Bulgarian cosmonaut
Georgi Ivanov (mayor) (born 1954), mayor of Haskovo, Bulgaria
Georgi Ivanov (footballer, born 1967), Bulgarian footballer
Georgi Ivanov (footballer, born 1976) or Gonzo Ivanov, Bulgarian footballer
Georgi Ivanov (footballer, born 1980), Bulgarian footballer
Georgi Ivanov (shot putter) (born 1985), Bulgarian shot putter
Georgi Ivanov (wrestler) (born 1989), Bulgarian wrestler
Gjorge Ivanov or Georgi Ivanov (born 1960), President of the Republic of Macedonia
Georgy Ivanov (1894–1958), poet of the Russian emigration
Georges Ivanov (1902–1979), Russian-born French singer
Georgi Tsvetkov Ivanov (born 1947), Bulgarian footballer